Nutbush Township is one of twelve townships in Warren County, North Carolina, United States.

Demographics
At the time of the survey the total population of Nutbush Township was 1,582 in 761 housing units. The average household size was 2.63 persons and the average family size 3.17 persons. Of the total population, 75.1% were Black, 20.9% White, 3.2% Hispanic or Latino, 0.5% American Indian or Alaskan Native, and 0.3% were of another ethnicity, 1.5% of the population was foreign born. The median age of males was 38.4 years, for females the median age was 38.0 years.

Geography
Nutbush Township is located at 36.47° North, 78.28° West.

The township consists of  land area and  water area.

References

Townships in Warren County, North Carolina
Townships in North Carolina